Tomáš Hiadlovský (born December 15, 1988) is a Slovak professional ice hockey goaltender. He started his career with HK Dukla Trenčín before moving to the Edinburgh Capitals in the Elite Ice Hockey League for the 2012/13 season.

External links

References

1988 births
Basingstoke Bison players
Edinburgh Capitals players
Étoile Noire de Strasbourg players
HC Slovan Ústečtí Lvi players
HK Dukla Trenčín players
Living people
Slovak ice hockey goaltenders
Sportspeople from Trenčín
Slovak expatriate sportspeople in Scotland
Slovak expatriate sportspeople in France
Expatriate ice hockey players in France
Slovak expatriate sportspeople in England
Slovak expatriate ice hockey players in the Czech Republic
Expatriate ice hockey players in England
Expatriate ice hockey players in Scotland